Ubu may refer to:

Arts and entertainment
The title character of Ubu Roi (King Ubu), an 1896 French play by Alfred Jarry and subsequent plays
Ubu Repertory Theater, New York City, dedicated to presenting French plays translated into English
Ubu Awards for Italian theater – see Italian entertainment awards
Ubu Films, a Sydney-based Australian underground filmmakers' cooperative that existed from 1965 to ca. 1972
Ubu Productions, Inc., a production company founded by television producer Gary David Goldberg
Ubu (album), the debut album by Illion, aka Radwimps vocalist Yojiro Noda
Ubu (Dragon Ball), a character in Dragon Ball media
"Ubu", a song by Blurt on their album Blurt in Berlin
"Ubu", a song by Methyl Ethel on their album Everything Is Forgotten
Ubu, a member of the League of Assassins and the trusted henchman of supervillain Ra's al Ghul in DC Comics

UBU
University of Bradford Union, a student union in the United Kingdom
University of Bristol Union, a student union in the United Kingdom
University of Burgos, a public university in the Spanish city of Burgos
Ubu Productions (trademarked UBU), a U.S. television production company
Burundi Workers' Party (Kirundi: Umugambwe wa'Bakozi Uburundi), a clandestine Marxist political party in Burundi
FC UBU, a football club based in Ulaanbaatar, Mongolia

Other uses
Ubu, Nepal, a Village Development Committee 
Unbiunium, symbol Ubu for '121', a theoretical chemical element
Ubu Roi, mascot of Ubu Productions
ISO 639-3 code for the Trans–New Guinea language Umbu-Ungu

See also
Pere Ubu, an experimental rock band from Cleveland, Ohio
UbuWeb, a public domain web-based educational resource for avant-garde material
UB (disambiguation)
Ubo (disambiguation)